The Cañada del Oro (Spanish for Canyon of Gold), is a primary watershed channel in the valley of Oro Valley, Arizona, US.  The word cañada has a tilde (ñ) and is pronounced  in Spanish; in English it is pronounced  , not like the country of Canada.

The Cañada del Oro originates in the remote Canyon del Oro in the Santa Catalina Mountains north of Tucson, fed by rainfall and melted snow from the northern face of Mount Lemmon and flows northward toward the town of Oracle. The Cañada del Oro is a perennial creek in Canyon del Oro while at higher altitudes.  The Cañada del Oro curves from flowing northward to southward through the town of Oro Valley north of Tucson, where it is usually a dry riverbed.  In Oro Valley the Cañada del Oro collects watershed from the western face of the Santa Catalina Mountains. The Cañada del Oro ultimately feeds into the Santa Cruz River just northwest of Tucson, the principal watershed channel in the Tucson valley.

Historically, the Cañada del Oro was the focus of significant interest in gold mining, beginning with Spanish explorers in the 17th century. As early as 1880, the Cañada del Oro was labeled "Gold Cañon Creek" on American maps. Following the Mexican–American War, American gold-rushers continued the search for the valuable mineral through the 1930s. Prospectors discovered minimal amounts of gold in the Cañada del Oro through placer mining operations, and reportedly mined gold in the lost Mine with the Iron Door. The lost mine is the subject of a novel of the same name written by Harold Bell Wright in 1923.

See also

 List of rivers of Arizona

References

External links

 U.S. Forest Service Canada del Oro Trail Guide
 Sierra Club Oracle Ridge–Canada del Oro Trail Guide

Santa Catalina Mountains
Geography of Tucson, Arizona
Canyons and gorges of Arizona
Landforms of Pima County, Arizona
Santa Cruz River (Arizona)